Bolatta Silis-Høegh is a Greenlandic contemporary artist and children's book author and illustrator who lives in Denmark.

She is the daughter of artist Aka Hoegh and the sister of artist Inuk Silis-Høegh.

Silis-Høegh is best known for her Haveforeningen Sisimiut 2068 piece on climate change. Her 2014 children's book Aima qaa schhh! was nominated for a Nordic Council Children and Young People’s Literature Prize.

In 2015 and 2016 she toured with two exhibits, both reflecting on uranium mining in Greenland.

Early life and education 
Silis-Høegh was born in 1981 in Qaqortoq, Greenland to Latvian photographer and videographer father Ivars Silis and Greenlandic artist Aka Hoegh. Her brother, Inuk Silis-Høegh, is nine years older.

She graduated from Aarhus Art Academy in 2006.

Art career 
Silis-Høegh works as a contemporary artist in multiple mediums which combines American pop culture with traditional Greenlandic cultural influences.

She first exhibited outside Greenland in 2005 at The North Atlantic House where her exhibit Den røde snescooter (English: The Red Snowmobile) was displayed alongside other Greenlandic artists.

Her best known work is Haveforeningen Sisimiut 2068 (English: Allotment Garden 2068) a three dimensional representation of a traditional Greenland allotment, set in the year 2068 and filled tropical plants and animals, a playful reflection on the impact of climate change. The piece won a Danish Arts Foundation award in 2010.

In 2015 and 2016, in response to the Greenlandic government's 2013 lifting of the moratorium on uranium mining, Silis-Høegh's toured with her Light On Lights Off exhibit. Also in 2016, her exhibition STORM was shown at Nordatlantens Brygge; the exhibit included themes of anger, politics, and environmentalism.

Publications 
Silis-Høegh published her first children's book Aima in 2011 and the 2014 sequel Aima qaa schhh! was nominated for the 2016 Nordic Council Children and Young People’s Literature Prize. Aima qaa schhh! is a 32-page book featuring  Aima as the protagonist and her relationship with her imaginary friend Manna. The book includes a wide range of art by Silis-Høegh.

 Aima (Danish Greenlandic), Milk Publishing, 2011, 
 Aima qaa schhh (English, Danish, Greenlandic) Milk Publishing, 2014 
 Aima meets the Mother of the Mountain (English, Danish, Greenlandic) Milk Publishing, 2020,

Personal life 
In 2014, Silis-Høegh lived in Vesterbro, Copenhagen, Denmark with her husband and their two children.

References

External links 
 Official website

1981 births
Greenlandic artists
Greenlandic Inuit people
Greenlandic emigrants to Denmark
People from Qaqortoq
Inuit artists
Living people
Artists from Copenhagen
Greenlandic writers
Writers from Copenhagen
Children's book illustrators
Danish children's book illustrators
Greenlandic women writers
21st-century Greenlandic people
Greenlandic women artists